Teacher's Pet (also known as Disney's Teacher's Pet) is an American animated television series produced by Walt Disney Television Animation and directed by Timothy Björklund.

The series follows a 9-year-old boy and his dog who dresses up as a boy. Created by Gary Baseman—the artistic designer for the Cranium board game—Bill Steinkellner, and Cheri Steinkellner, it was broadcast on ABC from 2000-2002, and finishing its run on Toon Disney in 2002.

Premise
The series follows Leonard Helperman, a 9-year-old boy in the 4th grade, who lives in fear because his mother, Mary Helperman, is his teacher. Because of this, he is often mocked and called a "teacher's pet", but he wants to be considered normal. Meanwhile, his dog Spot misses Leonard while he's at school, and yearns to be a human boy. So on the first day of the school year, he decides to come to class disguised as a new student named Scott Leadready II, who quickly becomes the most popular, influential kid in school. However, Leonard eventually finds out his secret. Although he disapproves of this at first, he allows Spot to continue attending school.

Characters

Main Cast
 Leonard Helperman: (Shaun Fleming) Spot's master and best friend. He's somewhat unpopular because his mom's the teacher, since the kids think it gives him an unfair advantage. But the sudden enrollment of Spot has helped him become more confident to a decent degree, due to the former's immediate popularity.
 Spot Helperman: (Nathan Lane; Kevin Schon in six episodes) Leonard's dog. He dresses up as a boy named Scott Leadready II and attends Leonard's school. He's the most popular and doesn't want anyone to know he's really a dog. Usually at the end of the show, he will compare the episode’s moral or lesson to a historical event. 
 Mary Lou Helperman: (Debra Jo Rupp) Leonard's mother. She is the perky and eccentric teacher of Leonard's class and embarrasses him. Just like all the other humans, she is too ignorant to be suspicious of Spot or tell that he and Scott are the same person. 
 Mr. Jolly: (David Ogden Stiers) Leonard's neurotic orange cat. He is afraid of the outside world and stays at home with the family's parrot. He's in love with the principal's cat but his fear of the outside world (and her evil nature) prevents any chance of romance.
 Pretty Boy: (Jerry Stiller) Leonard's wisecracking green canary. He calls Spot "Dog Breath". He's an honest guy and loyal friend but can be mean, rude and grumpy to everyone. He sometimes bullies Jolly because he’s scared of everything.

Recurring
 Principal Strickler: (Wallace Shawn) The straight-laced principal at Leonard and Spot's school. He owns a cat named Talullah. He hates dogs because one nipped off half his thumb. 
Ian Wazselewski: (Rob Paulsen) The class weirdo. His mom is the school nurse, so he thinks he has a special connection with Leonard. He's a guy with a chronic upper-respiratory infection...a guy who keeps his scab collection in his desk. Everyone calls him "Eww-an". 
 Leslie Dunkling: (Mae Whitman) Leonard's best friend and crush. She is very nice and lives next door to the Helpermans.
 Tyler, Taylor, and Trevor: (Pamela Adlon) Three of the coolest kids in school. Leonard wishes he was as cool as them. They usually participate in typical slacker activities like skateboarding. They sometimes pick on Leonard, but usually they are more socially tolerant of him thanks to Spot being his best friend.
 Younghee Mandlebom: (Lauren Tom) Another girl of the class that is from Korea who is Leslie's best friend. She is often mean to Leonard, but she still cares for him and as a matter of fact, she secretly is in love him.
 Chelsey and Kelsey: (Cree Summer) Twins of the class who are friends with Leslie. They are usually stuck-up and think they are more important than everyone else, but they always bicker with each other. Leonard tries to get their attention, but usually fails.
 Moltar: Ian's invisible friend. Usually Ian likes to do the weird stuff he does with him.

Movie Characters
 Dr. Ivan Krank: (Kelsey Grammer) An eccentric mad-scientist and the main antagonist of the film. He has a very fragile ego due to being called a 'whacko' for his claim of turning animals into humans. When Spot becomes a volunteer for his ray and becomes human, Krank plans to use him in order to be validated and acquire the rich and wealth he feels entitled to. He is also Ian Wazselewski's uncle. He is defeated when Spot manages to use his ray against him and turns him into a mouse and he is promptly eaten and killed by Mr. Jolly.
 Dennis and Adele: (Paul Reubens and Megan Mullally) A bumbling alligator and mosquito who serve as Dr. Krank's minions and supporting antagonists of the film. They are Dr. Krank's previous attempts to turn animals into humans but were only made humanoid. Dennis is the dim-witted one while Adele is the smart one. A running gag in the movie is that Dennis refers to Dr. Krank as their father, much to Krank's irritation.
 Mrs. Boogin: (Estelle Harris) A kindly old blind lady who pet sits for the Helpermans while they go to Florida in the movie. Due to her poor eyesight, she is very easy to fool when the pets decide to go to Florida and have stand-ins to take their place to make her none-the-wiser.
 Barry Anger: (Jay Thomas) A temperamental talk-show host who ends up instigating the movie's plot by introducing Dr. Krank on his show.

Episodes

Broadcast/Availability
The show aired on ABC's One Saturday Morning block beginning on September 9, 2000. The block would continue airing new episodes of the show until February 9, 2002 and reruns would last there until the block rebranded to ABC Kids on September 14, 2002.

The show began airing on Toon Disney on January 7, 2002 with new episodes premiering on the channel starting January 11, 2002. Toon Disney would continue airing new episodes of it each Friday until reaching its finale on May 10, 2002. As of the summer of 2006, it vanished from Toon Disney altogether and hasn't aired on American television since then.

In America, the show, along with the film, was made available on Disney+ on launch day, November 12, 2019.

Awards

Film
 
On January 16, 2004, Walt Disney Pictures released a full-length animated feature film based on the show in theaters, simply titled Teacher's Pet. The film serves as the series finale.

When Spot sees a mad scientist on TV who can turn animals into humans, he sees this as a chance to become an actual boy. However, when Spot becomes human, he soon realizes the experience isn't what he thought after all. Most of the actors from the series reprised their roles for the movie. Despite mostly positive reviews from critics, the movie was a box office failure, only making over half of its budget back.

References

Notes

External links
 
 
 

 
2004 American television series debuts
2000s American animated television series
2010s American animated television series
2019 American television series endings
American children's animated comedy television series
Animated television series about children
Animated television series about dogs
Disney Channel original programming
Toon Disney original programming
English-language television shows
Television series by Disney Television Animation
Television shows adapted into films